Loch Katrine is a lake at  above sea level in the Cascade Range, in King County, Washington (state) state. It is one of the many many lakes of the Alpine Lakes Wilderness. The lake contains a small island near its outlet.

References

Lakes of the Alpine Lakes Wilderness
Lakes of King County, Washington